Route 125 is a minor state highway in northwestern Connecticut, running entirely within the town of Cornwall.

Route description
Route 125 is known as Grange Hill Road and is a short connector between Route 4, which leads to the village of Cornwall Bridge, and Route 128, which leads to the village of West Cornwall. Route 125 is two lanes wide and is classified as a rural collector road for its entire length. It carries average volumes of only 500 vehicles per day.

History
Route 125 was established from a previously unnumbered road in the 1932 state highway renumbering. It originally ran from Jewell Street, where the town offices of Cornwall are located, to its current northern terminus at Route 128. At an undetermined time after 1938, the southern terminus was truncated to its current location at Route 4. It was scheduled for cancellation in the 1962 Route Reclassification Act but it was ultimately decided to be retained in the state highway system.

Junction list

References

External links

Transportation in Litchfield County, Connecticut
125
Cornwall, Connecticut